Loccum Abbey (Kloster Loccum) is a Lutheran monastery in the town of Rehburg-Loccum, Lower Saxony, near Steinhude Lake.

History

Originating as a foundation of Count Wilbrand of Hallermund, Loccum Abbey was settled from Volkenroda Abbey under the first abbot, Ekkehard, in 1163. An ancient account describes it as being "in loco horroris et vastæ solitudinis et prædonum et latronum commorationis" ("in a place of horror and a desert of solitude and a dwelling of thieves and brigands"); and adds that, after suffering much from want and from the barbarity of their neighbours, the monks in time brought the land into cultivation, and the people to the fear of God. Loccum very quickly grew wealthy and was under the direct protection of the Pope and the Emperor as an Imperial abbey (i.e., territorially independent). It was a Roman Catholic monastery run by the Cistercians.

In the 16th century in Protestant Reformation it became Lutheran. By 1700 the abbot of Loccum was permitted to marry and the Loccum Hof was built at Hanover to accommodate his spouse.  The monastery retained its property and wealth until the agrarian reforms of the 19th century, when it was included in the territory of the Duchy of Braunschweig-Lüneburg, otherwise Hanover.

Since 1891 the monastery has also operated as a Protestant seminary and academy, a tradition going back to around the start of the 19th century. The title of "abbot" is retained, anomalously.

Modern community 
The community today generally consists of between four and eight members, most of whom are also in holy orders. In addition the Lutheran Bishop of Hanover and the Director of Studies of the seminary are members ex officio. The abbot and prior are chosen from among the members.

Buildings
The abbey is known for its extremely well preserved monastic buildings from the late Romanesque period with church, cloister and associated rooms, chapter-house, sacristy, dormitory, refectory, library and lay-brothers' wing, as well as the various service buildings. The buildings as a whole are considered of equal architectural worth with Maulbronn Abbey and Bebenhausen Abbey. The monastery's ponds and woods also throw an interesting light on the abbey's medieval economy.

The abbey church of Saints Mary and George – now St. George's parish church – was probably built between 1230/40 to 1280.

Recent abbots 

 Gerhard Wolter Molanus (1677–1722)
 Just Christopherus Böhmer (1722–1732)
  (1732–1770)
  (1770–1791)
  (1791–1829)
  (1830), vacant till 1832
  (1832–1876)
  (1878–1901)
  (1902–1927)
 August Marahrens (1928–1950)
 Johannes Lilje (1950–1977)
  (1977–2000)
  (since 2000)

Burials
Valdemar of Denmark (bishop)

Notes
 Quoted in the Catholic Encyclopedia without a reference.

References

 Hirschler, Horst, and Berneburg, Ernst (eds.), 1980. Geschichten aus dem Kloster Loccum. Studien, Bilder, Dokumente. Hanover.
 Siegmund, Johannes Jürgen, 2003. Bischof Johannes Lilje, Abt zu Loccum. Eine Biographie. (also dissertation, Neuendettelsau, Kirchliche Hochschule, 2001). Göttingen.

External links 

 

Cistercian monasteries in Germany
Monasteries in Lower Saxony
1160s establishments in the Holy Roman Empire
1163 establishments in Europe
Religious organizations established in the 1160s
Lutheran seminaries
Lutheran monasteries in Germany
Christian monasteries established in the 12th century
Rehburg-Loccum